Broadcasters for the Minneapolis/Los Angeles Lakers National Basketball Association teams.

Television

1950s

1960s

1970s

1980s

1990s

2000s

2010s

Time Warner Cable

On February 14, 2011, Time Warner Cable and the Lakers announced the formation of two new regional sports networks (one in English, one in Spanish) that will exclusively televise the team's games and related programming for 20 years starting with the 2012–13 NBA season.

2020s

Radio

1940s

1950s

1960s

1970s

1980s

1990s

2000s

2010s

2020s

References

 
Prime Sports
Fox Sports Networks
Spectrum Sports Channel
Los Angeles Lakers
Broadcasters